The February 22, 2010, Peru bus crash was a collision between two buses that resulted in at least 38 deaths and the injury of 58. It took place along the Pan-American Highway near the town of Virú in northern Peru. The buses were carrying 80 and 70 passengers.

The head-on crash occurred in the early hours of the morning. No official cause was given, but Peruvian newspaper El Comercio published pictures which show that the stretch of road lacked a white line between the opposing lanes, though such a line is required by law.

The buses were operated by the Crisolito and America Express lines. According to unnamed police investigators, both bus drivers were exceeding the speed limits, and the Crisolito bus driver was responsible. He was attempting to pass a slower vehicle and ended up crashing into the other bus.

See also 
 List of traffic collisions (2010–present)

References 

2010 in Peru
2010 road incidents
Bus incidents in Peru
La Libertad Region
2010 disasters in Peru